Carlos J. Anderson (May 1, 1904 — July 11, 1978) was an American painter, illustrator and graphic designer. He did American Scene paintings of Utah pioneer buildings and scenery.

Early life
Anderson was born on May 1, 1904, in Midvale, Utah. He grew up in Sandy, Utah and he graduated from Jordan High School. He attended the University of Utah from 1924 to 1927. He also studied at the Los Angeles Art Institute, the Art Students League of New York from 1930 to 1932, the Académie Julian from 1932 to 1933, and the École des Beaux-Arts.

Career
Anderson became an American Scene painter in New York City in the 1930s. In 1934, he painted pioneer buildings and scenery for the U.S. government and the Utah State Historical Society. The paintings were acquired by the Utah Museum of Fine Arts, and reproduced on programs of the Utah Symphony and in the Junior League calendar. Anderson joined the San Francisco Civic Center Museum in 1948. He also worked for Abbott Laboratories, and he was also an illustrator for the Oakland Army Base.

His artwork was acquired by the Metropolitan Museum of Art, the Smithsonian American Art Museum, and the Springville Museum of Art.

Personal life and death
Anderson married Lucile Daily in 1949, and she died in 1973. He died on July 11, 1978, in Salt Lake City, Utah.

References

1904 births
1978 deaths
People from Midvale, Utah
University of Utah alumni
Painters from Utah
American graphic designers
American illustrators
American male painters
20th-century American painters
20th-century American male artists